Celenna is a genus of moths in the family Geometridae.

Species
 Celenna agalma (Prout, 1922)
 Celenna brachygenyx (Prout, 1925)
 Celenna callopistes (Prout, 1932)
 Celenna centraria (Snellen, 1880)
 Celenna chlorophora (Warren, 1897)
 Celenna festivaria (Fabricius, 1794)
 Celenna imbutaria (Walker, 1866)
 Celenna muscicolor (Warren, 1893)
 Celenna pulchraria (Rothschild, 1894)

References
 Celenna at Markku Savela's Lepidoptera and Some Other Life Forms
 Natural History Museum Lepidoptera genus database

Hypochrosini
Geometridae genera